Ursula Heinzelmann, born in Berlin in 1963, is a freelance German food and wine writer, a sommelière and a gastronome.

Career
She was a good cook before she had learned to read, according to a radio interview on HR2-Kultur, and she was a practitioner before she began to write about food: from 1986 to 1991 she ran a small hotel and restaurant on the shores of Lake Constance, and soon afterwards a delicatessen in Berlin specializing in fine French cheeses and wines. She has twice been awarded the annual Sophie Coe Prize in Food History at the Oxford Symposium on Food and Cookery, most recently in 2006. In 2008 she won the Prix du Champagne Lanson for her wine journalism on Slow Food Magazin.

In English she has written a book-length survey of German food, Food Culture in Germany, published by Greenwood Press in 2008. In Germany, however, she is best known for her series of three books on real and traditional food, beginning with Erlebnis Essen (2006). This includes a comparative tasting of top quality French and German butter in which the renowned appellation d'origine protégée butter of Isigny-Sainte-Mère met strong competition. The series continues with Erlebnis Kochen (subtitled "Manifesto for a cuisine without recipes": 2007). The third volume, Erlebnis Käse und Wein (2009), takes the form of a "voyage of discovery", an exploration of German cheese, German wine and how well the two go together. She took up the same theme in illustrated articles for the popular magazine Für Sie, "Cheese and Wine from Germany" and "Cheese and Wine Ideas".

As a journalist she has written in English for Saveur and in German for Slow Food Magazin and Frankfurter Allgemeine Sonntagszeitung. Her recipes from the Frankfurter Allgemeine were collected in book form in 2010. To Effilee she contributes a series on cheese, "Gegessener Käse", ranging from Israel and Hungary to Corsica, Britain and the United States. Her portrait of the American food historian Barbara Ketcham Wheaton, published in the same journal, has been described as "a pearl of journalism".

Ursula Heinzelmann returned to live in her native Berlin in 1993. Her 2007 article "A Night in Berlin" evokes the Christmas atmosphere of the no longer divided city as a group of friends explore its "bustling markets, venerable delicatessens, and cosmopolitan neighborhoods".

In 2014 Reaktion Books published her well-received "Beyond Bratwurst", a chronological history of food in Germany, followed by a German edition two years later, under the title "Was is(s)t Deutschland" (Tre Torri, 2016).

Publications

Books
 Erlebnis Essen: Vom Duft der Erdbeere und der Würze des Teltower Rübchens. Scherz-Verlag, 2006. 
 Erlebnis Kochen: Manifest für eine Küche ohne Rezepte. Scherz-Verlag, 2007. 
 Food Culture in Germany. Westport, CT: Greenwood Press, 2008.  Preview at Google Books
 Erlebnis Käse und Wein: Eine Entdeckungsreise durch neue deutsche Genusslandschaften. Scherz-Verlag, 2009. 
 Kulinarische Erlebnisse: Meine Rezepte aus der Frankfurter Allgemeinen Sonntagszeitung. Thorbecke Jan Verlag, 2010. 
 Beyond Bratwurst: A History of Food in Germany. London: Reaktion, 2014. 
 Was is(s)t Deutschland: Eine Kulturgeschichte über deutsches Essen. Wiesbaden: Tre Torri, 2016.

Articles
 "A Night in Berlin" in Saveur no. 107 (December 2007)
 "Die beharrliche Entschlüsselung der Kochbücher" in Effilee (29 Oct. 2009)
 "Gegessener Käse", series in Effilee (2009-2012)

References

External links 
 "Am Tisch mit Ursula Heinzelmann, „Ernährungshistorikerin“" at HR2-Kultur (podcast radio interview, 19 April 2012)
 "Käse ist Kunsthandwerk" ("Cheese is a Work of Art"): interview by Michael Miersch in Die Welt (4 September 2009)
 Ursula Heinzelmann: interview on Valentinas-Kochbuch.de (October 2010)

1963 births
Living people
Wine critics
German journalists
German food writers
Writers from Berlin
Women food writers
German gastronomes